A gubernatorial election was held on 8 August 2010 to elect the next governor of , a prefecture of Japan located in the Chūbu region of Honshu island.

Candidates  

Jin Murai, 73, a former veteran LDP lawmaker, elected in 2006 is not seeking reelection.
Yoshimasa Koshihara, 63, vice-governor (2006-2010).
Shuichi Abe, 49, bureaucrat, former Nagano vice governor (2001-2004). Backed by DPJ, he was also supported by the People’s New Party and SDP.
Takeshi Matsumoto, 59, former fine arts museum curator. Presented by the JCP.

Results

References 

2010 elections in Japan
Nagano gubernational elections
Politics of Nagano Prefecture